The Spring Creek Independent School District is a public school district located in southeastern Hutchinson County, Texas, United States.

The district consists of a single campus, Spring Creek School, that serves students in grades kindergarten through 12th grade. To boost enrollment, Spring Creek also accepts transfer students from outside of the district.

Secondary students (grades 7-12) from Spring Creek can attend school at SCISD or in one of three neighboring districts – Borger, Plemons-Stinnett-Phillips, Panhandle ISD,  or White Deer.

In 2009, the school district was rated "exemplary" by the Texas Education Agency.

History
The first Spring Creek School building was built in 1900, one year prior to the organization of Hutchinson County, on the Harvey Ranch. In its first year, there were a total of seven school-aged students, six males and one female, and six under school age for a total of 13. In 1901, the Hutchinson County Commissioners Court divided the county into four school districts, Spring Creek being named district #4. The school moved to several different locations until the 1930s, when a red brick school building was constructed. On March 8, 1938, the school was dedicated in a ceremony attended by approximately 500 people. The Spring Creek Independent School District was formed in 1949.

On September 22, 2001, Spring Creek celebrated its 100th anniversary and held an all-school reunion as well as an official historical marker dedication.

The district changed to a four day school week in fall 2018.

Principal/Superintendents
Since 1937, Spring Creek School has had 6 principal/superintendents. They are:

James W. Dillard (1937-1946)
L.E. Dyer (1946-1980)
Gene Weeks (1980-1987)
Susan Perez (1987-1991)
Peter Cameron (1991-1995)
Bret Madsen (1995-2012)
Mandy Poer (2012–Present)

Student demographics
As of the 2007-2008 school year, the Spring Creek Independent School District had a total enrollment of 85 students.

Ethnicity
Whites: 69 (81.2%)
Hispanics: 12 (14.1%)
African Americans: 4 (4.7%)
Socio-Economic Groups
Economic Disadvantaged: 41 (48.2%)
Limited English Proficient: 3 (3.5%)
Students w/Disciplinary Placements (2006–07): 0 (0.0%)
"At-Risk": 40 (47.1%)
Historic District Enrollment Figures by school year

1988-89 - 34 students
1989-90 - 32 students
1990-91 - 34 students
1991-92 - 42 students
1992-93 - 57 students
1993-94 - 66 students

1994-95 - 102 students
1995-96 - 91 students
1996-97 - 84 students
1997-98 - 106 students
1998-99 - 105 students
1999-00 - 118 students
2000-01 - 138 students

2001-02 - 144 students
2002-03 - 92 students
2003-04 - 94 students
2004-05 - 96 students
2005-06 - 99 students
2006-07 - 95 students

Programs
Spring Creek Elementary School offers a Gifted and Talented Program, a Learning Lab where students can receive assistance on individual curriculum objectives, and a strong technology program. As well as an active Parent-Teacher Organization (P.T.O.).

They also offer programs and classes such as: art, journalism, Student Council, National Junior Honor Society, and National Honor Society, basketball.

See also
List of school districts in Texas

References

External links
Spring Creek ISD – unofficial site hosted by WebSchoolPro.
Spring Creek ISD Alumni

School districts in Hutchinson County, Texas